Etrema is a genus of sea snails, marine gastropod mollusks in the family Clathurellidae.

Species
According to the World Register of Marine Species (WoRMS), species with valid names within the genus Etrema include:

 Etrema aliciae (Melvill & Standen, 1895)
 Etrema alphonsianum (Hervier, 1896): mentioned in OBIS as Etrema (Etrema) alphonsiana (Hervier, 1896) 
 Etrema argillacea (Hinds, 1843)
 Etrema bicolor (Angas, 1871)
 Etrema capillata Hedley, 1922
 Etrema carinata Bozzetti, 2009
 Etrema catapasta Hedley, 1922
 Etrema constricta Laseron, 1954
 Etrema crassilabrum (Reeve, 1843)
 Etrema crassina (Angas, 1880)
 Etrema cratis Kilburn & Dekker, 2008
 Etrema curtisiana Hedley, 1922
 Etrema denseplicata (Dunker, 1871)
 Etrema elegans Hedley, 1922
 Etrema firma Hedley, 1922
 Etrema gainesii (Pilsbry, 1895)
 Etrema glabriplicatum (Sowerby III, 1913): mentioned in OBIS as Etrema (Etrema) glabriplicata (Sowerby, 1913) 
 Etrema hedleyi (Oliver, 1915) 
 Etrema huberti (Sowerby III, 1893)
 † Etrema kaipara Powell, 1942 
 Etrema kitcheni Laseron, 1954
 Etrema labiosa Hedley, 1922
 Etrema lata (Smith E. A., 1888)
 Etrema leukospiralis Chen & Huang, 2005
 Etrema levicosta Laseron, 1954
 Etrema maryae (McLean & Poorman, 1971) 
 Etrema minutissimelirata (Hervier, 1896)
 Etrema nassoides (Reeve, 1845)
 Etrema orirufa Hedley, 1922
 Etrema parvula Bozzetti, 2020
 Etrema paucimaculata (Angas, 1880)
 Etrema perlissa (Smith E. A., 1904)
 Etrema polydesma Hedley, 1922
 Etrema pyramis Laseron, 1954
 Etrema ravella Hedley, 1922
 Etrema royi (G. B. Sowerby III, 1913)
 Etrema rubroapicata (Smith E. A., 1882)
 Etrema scalarina (Deshayes, 1863)
 Etrema sparula Hedley, 1922
 Etrema spurca (Hinds, 1843)
 Etrema streptonotus (Pilsbry, 1904)
 Etrema subauriformis (Smith E. A., 1879)
 Etrema tenera (Hedley, 1899)
 Etrema texta (Dunker, 1860)
 Etrema tortilabia Hedley, 1922
 Etrema trigonostomum (Hervier, 1896)

The Indo-Pacific Molluscan Database also includes the following species with names in current use :
 Etrema lemniscata (G. & H. Nevill, 1875)
 Subgenus Etrema Hedley, 1918
 Etrema alliterata (Hedley, 1915)
 Subgenus Etremopsis Powell, 1942
 Etrema albata (Smith, 1882)
Species brought into synonymy
 Etrema acricula Hedley, 1922: synonym of Nannodiella acricula (Hedley, 1922) 
 Etrema culmea Hedley, 1922: synonym of Etrema crassilabrum (Reeve, 1843)
 Etrema granolirata Powell, 1944: synonym of Heterocithara granolirata (Powell, 1944)

References

External links
 Smith, E.A. (1888) Diagnoses of new species of Pleurotomidae in the British Museum. Annals and Magazine of Natural History, series 6, 2, 300–317
 Brazier, J. 1876. A list of the Pleurotomidae collected during the Chevert expedition, with the description of the new species. Proceedings of the Linnean Society of New South Wales 1: 151–162
 Hedley, C. 1918. A checklist of the marine fauna of New South Wales. Part 1. Journal and Proceedings of the Royal Society of New South Wales 51: M1-M120
 Oyama K. (1953). Review of the known species of the Japanese Turridae (1). Venus. 17(3): 151-160
 Bouchet, P.; Kantor, Y. I.; Sysoev, A.; Puillandre, N. (2011). A new operational classification of the Conoidea (Gastropoda). Journal of Molluscan Studies. 77(3): 273-308